All You was an American women’s monthly magazine published by Time Inc. and sold at Walmart, Sam's Club and via subscription. The monthly magazine was first published in August 2004. All You focused on value: Each story offered money-saving and/or time-saving tips, and the magazine developed a community of Reality Checkers, thousands of women who contribute ideas and tips that appear on many of All You’s pages. The magazine ceased publication in December 2015.

Target audience
All You is targeted toward the average female Walmart customer and features models wearing clothing sold within the store. It also contained stories featuring what the magazine considers "real women" who are diverse in age, appearance, background and culture.

Value
All You included a large number of coupons, and even includes an index to help navigate through them. A weekly emailed newsletter titled All You Deals and Meals was available from the magazine which offers subscribers a preview of coupons available in future magazines. Themed events were held in Walmart stores across the United States where "brand ambassadors" from the magazine act as "personal shoppers" to assist customers shopping for value. These events were sponsored by the magazine's advertisers. The magazine also sponsored other events aimed at helping modern women.

References

2004 establishments in New York (state)
2015 disestablishments in New York (state)
Monthly magazines published in the United States
Defunct women's magazines published in the United States
Magazines established in 2004
Magazines disestablished in 2015
Magazines published in New York City
Walmart
Supermarket tabloids